The canton of Quimper-1 is an administrative division of the Finistère department, northwestern France. Its borders were modified at the French canton reorganisation which came into effect in March 2015. Its seat is in Quimper.

It consists of the following communes:
Guengat
Locronan
Plogonnec
Plomelin
Plonéis
Pluguffan
Quimper (partly)

References

Cantons of Finistère